Ustad Barkat Ali Khan (1908 – 19 June 1963) was a Pakistani classical singer, younger brother of Bade Ghulam Ali Khan and elder brother of Mubarak Ali Khan, and belonged to the Patiala gharana of music.

Early life and career
Barkat Ali Khan was born in Kasur in the Punjab province of then British India. He had his initial training from his father, Ali Baksh Khan Kasuri, and later by his elder brother Bade Ghulam Ali Khan. After 1947 Partition of British India, Barkat Ali Khan, with his family, migrated to Pakistan and focused on the lighter aspects of Hindustani classical music. He was widely acknowledged as one of the great exponents of Thumri, Dadra, Geet and Ghazal, and was well known for both Purab and Punjab Ang Thumris. The great Mohammad Rafi was a shagird of Barkat Ali Khan.

Many still consider him a superior thumri singer than his elder brother, though he didn't receive acknowledgement to the extent Bade Ghulam Ali Khan did. He taught noted ghazal singer Ghulam Ali. Many people in Pakistan say that simplicity and humility were the hallmark of his personality. He started a new trend of ghazal-singing in Pakistan. Before Mehdi Hassan became known as the 'King of ghazals' in the 1970s, Barkat Ali Khan and Begum Akhtar were considered the stalwarts of ghazal-singing during the 1950s and 1960s. Barkat Ali Khan, in a rare live radio interview to Radio Pakistan, Lahore, had said," My forefathers, at one time, lived in the hilly tracts of Jammu and Kashmir, so they used to sing 'songs of the hills' (Pahari Geet). I learned to sing those Pahari Geets from them".

Super-hit ghazals and geets
 "Woh jo hum main tum main qaraar tha tumhe yaad ho ke na yaad ho"
Ghazal sung by Barkat Ali Khan, lyrics by the famous poet Momin Khan Momin
 "Donaun Jahan Teri Mohabbat Mein Haar Ke, Woh Jaa Raha Hai Shab-e-Gham Guzaar Ke"
Ghazal sung by Ustad Barkat Ali Khan, lyrics by the renowned poet Faiz Ahmad Faiz
 "Baghon Mein Paray Jhoolay, Tum Bhool Gaey Humko, Hum Tumko Nahin Bhoolay"
Sung by Ustad Barkat Ali Khan, a folk 'Mahia' geet. Later this same song made even more popular by his grandson Sajjad Ali
 "Abb Kay Sawan Ghar Aa Ja"  A Thumri Pahari geet Sung by Barkat Ali Khan 
 Hasti apni habab ki si haii., Ghazal penned by Meer taqi meer 
 "Uss Bazm Mein Mujhe Nahin Banti Haya Kiyyay"
Ghazal sung by Barkat Ali Khan, lyrics by Mirza Ghalib

Death
He died a premature death at the age of 55 on 19 June 1963 in Lahore, Pakistan.

References

1908 births
1963 deaths
20th-century Pakistani male singers
Pakistani ghazal singers
Pakistani classical singers
Patiala gharana
Vocal gharanas
Hindustani singers
Pakistani music educators
Pakistani radio personalities
Punjabi people
People from Kasur District